Steve Leven (born 15 October 1982 in Sydney, Australia) is a retired Australian professional basketball player.

College career

Professional career
Leven started his professional career after declaring an early entry into the 2006 NBA Draft. He then participated in the Las Vegas NBA Summer League and the Rocky Mountain NBA Summer League. He then joined Unicaja Málaga in Spain's top-level Liga ACB, PAOK, BC Spartak Saint Petersburg, Türk Telekom B.K., ratiopharm Ulm.

Basketball career
Auburn University (Auburn Tigers)
University of Wyoming (Wyoming Cowboys) (NCAA) transfer year, did not play
University of Wyoming (NCAA)
University of Wyoming (NCAA)
University of Wyoming (NCAA)
2006 NBA Draft Early Entry (not drafted)
NBA Summer League - San Antonio Spurs
NBA Summer League - Dallas Mavericks
NBA - Los Angeles Clippers , USA - Pre Season
NBA - Los Angeles Clippers , USA - 10 Day Contract
Spain - Unicaja Malaga Spain
Greece - PAOK
Russia - BC Spartak Saint Petersburg
Turkey - Türk Telekom B.K.
Germany - ratiopharm Ulm

References

External links

1982 births
Living people
Arkadikos B.C. players
Auburn Tigers men's basketball players
Australian men's basketball players
Basketball players from Sydney
Baloncesto Málaga players
Newcastle Eagles players
Scottish men's basketball players
Shooting guards
Small forwards
Wyoming Cowboys basketball players